Yaroslav Dmytruk (6 September 1964) is an association footballer from the former Soviet Union. After retiring from playing football, Dmytruk became a football referee in lower leagues of Ukraine.

In 1983 Dmytruk took part in the Summer Spartakiad of the Peoples of the USSR in the team of Ukrainian SSR.

References

External links
 
 Profile at the Referee Committee of Ukraine

1964 births
Living people
Soviet footballers
Ukrainian footballers
NK Veres Rivne players
FC Khutrovyk Tysmenytsia players
Ukrainian football referees
Association footballers not categorized by position